Georges Conchon  (9 May 1925 in St. Avitus (Puy-de-Dôme) – 29 July 1990) was a French writer and screenwriter.

Biography 
He grew up in a family of teachers, and after graduating in philosophy, passed the support of the parliamentary and between the Assembly French Union where he was division head from 1952 to 1958. 
He began writing, while traveling extensively, notably in Africa. 
He became secretary in 1960 debates in the Senate until 1980. 
He was journalist and novelist, he began his career as a scriptwriter in 1967.

His first published novel will be Les Grandes Lessives in 1953, followed by Chemins écartés. He is then hired by Pierre Lazareff to France-Soir as a journalist. This experience led to L'État sauvage, which earned him the Prix Goncourt in 1964.

Before the Goncourt, he had received the Fénéon in 1956, then the Booksellers prize in 1960 for La Corrida de la victoire.

As a screenwriter, his record is brilliant, including L'Horizon (directed by Jacques Rouffio 1967), Sept Morts sur ordonnance (J. Rouffio 1976), La Victoire en chantant (Jean-Jacques Annaud 1976), Judith Therpauve (Patrice Chéreau, 1978), La Banquière (Francis Girod 1980). It also works in television, directing A2 on a collection of films and with the launch of the series Châteauvallon. Some of his books were made into movies, including The Savage State and Le sucre by Jacques Rouffio.

His last film collaboration scenario has been devoted to the history of the famous assassin of the nineteenth century, Lacenaire. Directed by Francis Girod, the film was released in theaters in 1990.

He was Chevalier de la Legion of Honour and an Officer of the Order of Merit and Arts and Letters, and was politically active at PSU and then the Socialist Party.

Works
 1953: Les Grandes Lessives, Albin Michel
 1954: Les Chemins écartés, Albin Michel
 1955: L'Horizon. Les honneurs de la guerre, Albin Michel. (awarded Prix Fénéon)
 1957: Tous comptes faits, Albin Michel
 1959: La Corrida de la victoire, Albin Michel. Prix des Libraires
 1961: L'Esbrouffe, Albin Michel. Prix des Volcans
 1964: L'État sauvage, Albin Michel. Prix Goncourt
 1967: Le Canada, Arthaud. Prix Montcalm
 1967: L'Apprenti gaucher, Albin Michel
 1967: L'Auvergne, Arthaud
 1969: Nous la Gauche devant Louis-Napoléon, Flammarion
 1972: L'Amour en face, Albin Michel
 1975: Sept Morts sur ordonnance, Presses de la Cité
 1977: Le Sucre, Albin Michel
 1978: Judith Therpauve, Jean-Claude Simoën
 1980: La Banquière, Ramsay
 1983: Le Bel Avenir, Albin Michel
 1986: Mon beau-frère a tué ma sœur, Albin Michel
 1987: Colette Stern, Gallimard
 1990: Lacenaire, Edition du Seuil
 1965: Pourquoi pas Vamos de Georges Conchon, mise en scène Jean Mercure, Théâtre Edouard VII

Screenplays
 1967: L'Étranger de Luchino Visconti
 1975: Il pleut sur Santiago d'Helvio Soto
 1975: Sept morts sur ordonnance de Jacques Rouffio
 1976: La Victoire en chantant de Jean-Jacques Annaud
 1977: L'État sauvage de Francis Girod
 1978: Judith Therpauve de Patrice Chéreau
 1978: Le sucre de Jacques Rouffio
 1980: La Banquière de Francis Girod
 1980: Une affaire d'hommes de Nicolas Ribowski
 1985: Châteauvallon''' (feuilleton télévisé)
 1986: 'Mon beau-frère a tué ma sœur de Jacques Rouffio
 1990: Lacenaire de Francis Girod
 1995: La Marche de Radetzky (série télévisée) de Axel Corti

Author
 1966: L'Horizon de Jacques Rouffio
 1977: L'État sauvage de Francis Girod
 1978: Le sucre de Jacques Rouffio

Dialogue
 1966: L'Horizon de Jacques Rouffio
 1986: Mon beau-frère a tué ma sœur de Jacques Rouffio

Actor
 1976: René la Canne de Francis Girod

1925 births
1990 deaths
People from Puy-de-Dôme
Prix des libraires winners
Writers from Auvergne-Rhône-Alpes
Prix Goncourt winners
Burials at Père Lachaise Cemetery
French male writers
Prix Fénéon winners
20th-century French male writers